Amifontaine is a commune in the department of Aisne in the Hauts-de-France region of northern France.

Geography
Amifontaine is located some 20 km southeast of Laon and 40 km northwest of Rheims.  The Autoroute des Anglais (A26, E17) passes through the western side of the commune from north to south but has no exit in the commune.  Access to the commune is by road D52 from Ramecourt in the northwest through the commune to the village and continuing south-east to Prouvais. There is also road D89 from La Malmaison in the northeast through the village to Juvincourt-et-Damary in the southwest. The D24 road also passes through the north of the commune from west to east forming the southern border of a large forested area extending beyond the northern border of the commune. The commune is almost entirely farmland except for the forested area in the north. Amifontaine station has rail connections to Reims and Laon.

The small river Miette (also called La Source à l'Aisne in its uppermost part) rises north of the village and flows south to join the river Aisne near Berry-au-Bac.

Neighbouring communes and villages

Administration
List of Successive Mayors of Amifontaine

History

From 8 December 1939 to 16 May 1940 No. 12 Squadron RAF was stationed at an airstrip in Amifontaine. On 12 May 1940 a mission was flown from Amifontaine to destroy two bridges over the Albert Canal. Only one out of five aircraft returned. Flying Officer Garland and Sergeant Gray were both awarded posthumous Victoria Crosses for "most conspicuous bravery".

Population

Sites and monuments

Saint-Rémi Church

See also
 Communes of the Aisne department

References

External links
Amifontaine on the old National Geographical Institute website 
40000 Bell Towers website 
Amifontaine on Géoportail, National Geographic Institute (IGN) website 
Amifontaine on the 1750 Cassini Map

Communes of Aisne